"The Wizard and I" is a musical number from the hit musical Wicked.  It is primarily a solo number for the character of Elphaba, though the character Madame Morrible also sings in the introduction to the song.

Context 
The song is performed in the beginning of the first act of the musical. In it, Madame Morrible tells Elphaba of her talents, and tells her that she will arrange a meeting with the Wizard. This begins Elphaba's desire to change herself, with the aid of the Wizard, whom she still believes to be genuine, and able to help her with all of her problems. Elphaba also sings about redeeming herself in her father, Frexspar's, and her sister Nessarose's eyes, and having the Wizard cure her of her strange green appearance. Also, Elphaba dreams about becoming a new person, not only on the outside, but doing great deeds in league with the Wizard, and forming Oz's "favorite team."

Music
"The Wizard and I" features the "Unlimited" theme present throughout the musical. In this piece, Elphaba prophesizes a celebration throughout Oz regarding her, though she does not know it regards her "death" at the end of the musical, after being "melted" by Dorothy, which Elphaba ironically sings about in saying that she is "so happy I could melt." She also imagines that "when people see me [Elphaba] they will scream" from love, not fear. Toward the song’s climax, she declares that she will be the center of a “celebration throughout Oz” that occurs in the show’s opening. Another notable characteristic of the song is the numerous times that the word "good" appears in the libretto.

The beginning of the song features many elements of the song "Making Good," which was cut from the final drafts of the musical.

The original German recording of this song, "Der Zauberer und ich", is sung by Dutch actress, Willemijn Verkaik. She sings this song in three languages - German, Dutch and English. In an interview, Verkaik said that for her, "The Wizard and I" is the hardest song for her to sing in the English productions. This is not the case for the German and Dutch productions, where "No Good Deed" was considerably harder.

Other versions
John Barrowman has a reworking of the song for his self-titled album John Barrowman titled  "The Doctor and I", which is an exclusive bonus track on iTunes.

References

Songs about wizards
Idina Menzel songs
Songs from Wicked (musical)
Songs from musicals
Female vocal duets
Songs written by Stephen Schwartz (composer)
2003 songs